Bathinda College of Law or commonly known as BCL is a private law school situated beside Badal Road in Bathinda, Bathinda district in the Indian state of Punjab. It offers undergraduate 3 years law course and 5 year Integrated B.A. LL.B. which is approved by Bar Council of India (BCI), New Delhi and affiliated to Punjabi University.

History
Bathinda College of Law was established in 2008 by the Bathinda Educational and Environmental Care Society.

References

Law schools in Punjab, India
Educational institutions established in 2008
2008 establishments in Punjab, India